James Campbell (11 November 1922 – 7 July 1983) was a Scottish footballer. He was in born in East Kilbride.

Campbell played as a full back in the Football League for Charlton Athletic.

References

1922 births
1983 deaths
Scottish footballers
Sportspeople from East Kilbride
Association football fullbacks
Charlton Athletic F.C. players
English Football League players
Footballers from South Lanarkshire